The Advertising Council of German Industry was a panel established by the Law of Commercial Advertising of 12 September 1933. Composed of knowledgeable representatives of business, it had a mandate to oversee all publicity, posters, exhibits, fairs, and advertising. The council members were appointed by the Propaganda Ministry, which thereby secured control over the content and format of all advertising campaigns. These had to be submitted to and approved by the council.

Bibliography
Christian Zentner, Friedemann Bedürftig (1991). The Encyclopedia of the Third Reich.  Macmillan, New York. 

Nazi Party organizations
1933 establishments in Germany